Aspidoscelis opatae, the Opata whiptail, is a species of teiid lizard endemic to Mexico.

References

opatae
Reptiles described in 1969
Taxa named by John William Wright (herpetologist)
Reptiles of Mexico